Euclidium is a small genus of plants containing two species, Euclidium syriacum and Euclidium tenuissimum. These are white-flowered annual herbs native to Eurasia.

References

External links
 Jepson Manual Treatment

Brassicaceae
Brassicaceae genera